Bani Haritsah Mosque, or Masjid Al-Mustarah, is a mosque located in Medina, Saudi Arabia. It is located at Sayyid asy-Syuhada' street. The naming comes from an account of the Islamic prophet Muhammad taking a rest in this place once, during the way home returning from the Battle of Uhud. The word "Mustarah" means the place for resting.

The mosque was renovated during the time of the king Fahd, and the place was expanded to 491 square meters wide. Houses belonging to the members of Bani Harithah tribe are located nearby the mosque. The place was of strategic importance for the defense of the city during the time of the Prophet, it is where the starting point of the trench for the Battle of the Trench was dug up as well. From here also the army of Mu'awiyah and its leader Muslim ibn Uqba entered the city.

See also
 List of mosques in Saudi Arabia
  Lists of mosques 
 List of mosques in Medina

Mosques in Medina